Durasovo is a rural locality (a village) in Rassvetovsky Selsoviet, Belebeyevsky District, Bashkortostan, Russia. The population was 5 as of 2010. There is 1 street.

Geography 
Durasovo is located 19 km west of Belebey (the district's administrative centre) by road. Kirillovka is the nearest rural locality.

References 

Rural localities in Belebeyevsky District